Berlitz Corporation is a language education and leadership training company which is based in Princeton, New Jersey. The company was founded in 1878 by Maximilian Berlitz in Providence, Rhode Island in the United States. Berlitz Corporation is owned by “Berlitz Holdings”, a company established through a 100% investment by ILSC Holdings LP (which owns ILSC Education Group, a company engaged in language education businesses such as study abroad), with more than 547 company-owned and franchised locations in more than 70 countries.

History

Berlitz started in 1878, when Maximilian Berlitz was in need of an assistant French instructor; he employed a Frenchman by the name of Nicholas Joly, only soon to discover that Joly barely spoke English, and was hired to teach French to English speakers in their native language. The first Berlitz language school opened in Providence, Rhode Island, in July 1878. A decade later, Berlitz moved to Boston, Massachusetts, and opened additional schools. Soon after, he opened schools in New York and New Jersey. In 1886, he moved the headquarters and his personal residence to New York City. In 1895, a children's language learning book was published by Maximilian Berlitz. By 1914, there were about 200 Berlitz schools; 63 Berlitz schools in Germany, and 27 in Britain.

Growth
By the time of the start of World War I in 1914, there were over 200 Berlitz Schools worldwide. Maximilian Berlitz died in 1921. His son-in-law and associate, Victor Harrison-Berlitz, assumed leadership of the business. Harrison died in 1932, and control passed briefly to his son, Victor Harrison-Berlitz Jr. The control of the company was thereafter passed to Jacques Strumpen-Darrie. Jacques' son Robert succeeded his father as president in 1953.

In the 1950s, Berlitz opened its first Latin American language center in Mexico, followed by locations in Brazil, Venezuela, Argentina, Colombia, Chile, and Peru. In 1966, Berlitz reached Asia, starting with a language center in Tokyo. Today there are more than 90 Berlitz centers in Asia.

Macmillan, Inc. ownership era
In 1966, Berlitz became a subsidiary of Macmillan, Inc. Robert Strumpen-Darrie continued as president until his retirement in 1970, Raphael Alberola became CEO for about 4 or 5 years and then Elio Boccitto led the company through most of the 1980s. In November 1988, Maxwell Communication Corporation took over Macmillan, and just a year later, Berlitz was made public.

In 1992-08-19, Berlitz International Inc. announced it has signed a definitive agreement to sell a 67 percent its stake to the Fukutake Publishing Company, with merger to be completed by the end of the year. In 1993-01-28, Berlitz International Inc. announced a court order disengaging the language services company from the bankrupt Maxwell Communication Corporation had cleared the way for Berlitz's pending merger, while shareholders approved the merger at a stockholder meeting in New York held on the same day, with merger to be closed in 1993-02-08.

Benesse Corporation ownership era
In 2001, Berlitz became a wholly owned subsidiary of the Benesse Corporation. In 2002, Berlitz publishing was sold to Langenscheidt. (Today, Berlitz Publishing is owned by APA Publications.)

In 2010-11-01, Berlitz International, Inc. announced its renaming from Berlitz International, Inc. to Berlitz Corporation, effective in the same day.

In February 2022, all shares of Berlitz Corporation held by Benesse Holdings were transferred to “Berlitz Holdings”, a company established through a 100% investment by ILSC Holdings LP (which owns ILSC Education Group, a company engaged in language education businesses such as study abroad). At the same time, the Board of Directors of Benesse Holdings transferred all shares of Berlitz Japan (15.75% of all shares held by Benesse) to Berlitz.

Subsidiaries
Berlitz Japan, Inc.(ベルリッツ・ジャパン株式会社): Berlitz's first branch in Japan, established in Akasaka in 1966.
Berlitz Publishing (Apa Publications UK Ltd): Berlitz's publishing division.
ELS Educational Services, Inc.: In 1988, Berlitz International, Inc. acquired Language Institute for English (L.I.F.E.), which later became ELS Language Centers.
Second Language Testing, Inc.: Specializes in the development of second language proficiency tests and the translation and adaptation of standardized achievement tests to students' native languages and cultures. In 2011-03-07, Berlitz Corporation announced the acquisition of Second Language Testing, Inc. (SLTI).
Telelangue SA: In 2011-08-11, Berlitz Corporation announced the acquisition of Telelangue SA.

Former subsidiaries
Phoenix Associates Co., Ltd. (フェニックス アソシエイツ株式会社): In 2009, Berlitz acquired Phoenix Associates Co., Ltd. On 2012-10-31, Berlitz Corporation announced merging Phoenix Associates Co., Ltd. into Berlitz Japan, Inc., effective 2013-01-01.

Maximilian D. Berlitz
Maximilian Berlitz was born in Germany in 1852, the son of a family of teachers and mathematicians. He emigrated to the United States in 1870, settling in Westerly, Rhode Island. In 1877 Berlitz moved to Providence, Rhode Island where he was an instructor of languages at the Bryant and Stratton National Business College, later to become Warner's Polytechnic Business College after an ownership change.

The Berlitz Method
"The Berlitz Method" uses the direct method and focuses on using language as a tool for communication. The direct method, as opposed to the traditional grammar translation method, advocates teaching through the target language only, the rationale being that students will be able to work out grammatical rules from the input language provided, without necessarily being able to explain the rules overtly. Today, there are a variety of derivative methods and theories that found their beginnings in the natural and communicative elements that were pioneered by Berlitz.

Financial results

For the fiscal years 2004 to 2010 (in millions of US dollars):
2004: 395.2
2005: 423.4
2006: 464.9
2007: 529.7
2008: 607.9
2009: 527.3
2010: 563.4

The total number of language lessons given during the year 2011 was 6,506 thousand. The number of language centers was 563 as of December 31, 2011. As of early 2013, 75% of its revenue was from English language lessons.

Unions
In Japan, Berlitz teachers are represented by several unions. In the Kansai region they are represented by the General Union, and in the Kanto region they are represented by Begunto, the Berlitz Tokyo General Union, part of Tozen, and the Berlitz Union at NUGW which belongs to the National Trade Union Council.

In Germany, teachers and office staff are represented by GEW. In November 2010, management attempted for the first time to claw back the employee gains of the past 30 years in order to substantially reduce the conditions guaranteed in the collective bargaining agreement, threatening to lay off up to half of the contract teachers if the givebacks were not agreed to.

Industrial action

While the situation at Berlitz is different from country to country, in Japan there has been substantial industrial action, including the 2007–08 Berlitz Japan strike organised by Begunto, which grew into the longest and largest sustained strike among language teachers in Japan. Berlitz filed suit against the union for damages it says it suffered during the strike, but the claim was rejected by the Tokyo District Court on 27 February 2012. Within a week Berlitz appealed the ruling to the high court, with the first court date being on May 28, 2012. The final hearing was held on December 27, 2012, when an agreement was struck between Berlitz and the union. Berlitz withdrew their high court lawsuit and new rules for collective bargaining were also established. They will again be conducted in English, after the language was changed to Japanese previously. Berlitz also promised to disclose more financial information to the union. The company also agreed to pay a base-up raise to current union members plus a lump sum bonus to the union.

In 2010, employees of Berlitz language centers in Germany experienced a major labor conflict, as management planned to lay off nearly 70 contract teachers in order to economize with a staff of freelancers.

See also
Language education

References

External links
Second Language Testing, Inc. Homepage
Corporations: The Language Merchants, June. 21, 1963, TIME

Benesse
Companies based in Princeton, New Jersey
Education companies established in 1878
Schools of English as a second or foreign language